Major General Henry Templer Alexander, CB, CBE, DSO (17 May 1911 – 16 March 1977) was a British Army officer who served as Chief of Defence Staff of the Ghana Armed Forces between 1960 and 1961.

Early life 
Alexander was born on 17 May 1911. He was the son of Major General H. L. Alexander, CB, CMG, DSO, and Dorothy Alexander. He was educated at Sedbergh School, Yorkshire, then an all-boys public school.

Military career 
On 27 August 1931, having attended the Royal Military College, Sandhurst, Alexander was commissioned into the Cameronians (Scottish Rifles) as a second lieutenant. He was promoted in 1934 as a lieutenant. In 1939, he was promoted to the rank of Captain. He then served as an instructor at the Royal Military College, Sandhurst for two years. Between 1939 and 1945, he saw action in the Second World War in North Africa, Italy, India, Burma, and North West Europe. He was promoted Major in 1943 and Commanding Officer, 2 Battalion, Cameronians (Scottish Rifles) in Italy in 1944. He has also served as Chief Instructor, School of Combined Operations, 1946–1947 and General Staff Officer 1 first at Hong Kong, 1948–1950, then at Camberley, Surrey.

Alexander became a Colonel in 1954 and was appointed Commanding Officer, 1 Battalion, Cameronians (Scottish Rifles) between 1954 and 1955 and he also commanded 26 Gurkha Infantry Brigade between 1955 and 1957. Between 1958 and 1960, he served as Senior Instructor, Staff College, Camberley, Surrey, Brigade General Staff, Department of the Chief of the Imperial General Staff, War Office and at the Imperial Defence College.

Between 1960 and 1961, he worked with the Ghana Armed Forces as Chief of Defence Staff. During that period, he commanded the Ghanaian contingent of Operation des Nations Unies au Congo, the UN force in the newly independent Congo. Upon the initial Congolese request for assistance, before the approval for deployment of UN forces, Alexander flew into Leopoldville with a single Ghanaian platoon. The Ghanaian troops were subsequently 're-hatted' as UN forces rather than under bilateral terms, and augmented. From 1962 until his retirement he served as Chief of Staff of Northern Command.

Later life 
Alexander retired in 1965. In 1968 he served as an Observer with the International Observer Team on Genocide in Nigeria.

Honours and decorations 
1943 - MBE
1945 - OBE
1957 - DSO
1960 - CBE
1961 awarded CB

Publications 
African tightrope: My two years as Nkrumah's Chief of Staff (Pall Mall Press, London, 1965).

References 

1911 births
1977 deaths
Academics of the Royal Military College, Sandhurst
Ghanaian soldiers
People educated at Sedbergh School
Cameronians officers
British Army major generals
British Army personnel of World War II
Graduates of the Royal Military College, Sandhurst
Chiefs of Army Staff (Ghana)
Academics of the Staff College, Camberley